The Tennessee Train are a women's American football team of the Independent Women's Football League (IWFL). They are located in Chattanooga, Tennessee, and play their home games at Chattanooga Central High School. The team was founded in 2013 as a member of the Women's Football Alliance. The Train became members of the IWFL in 2015.

Season-by-season records

|-
|2014 || 5 || 3 || 0 || — || —
|-
|2015 || 3 || 5 || 0 || — || did not qualify
|-
|Totals ||8||8||0||—||—

References

External links

Independent Women's Football League
American football in Chattanooga, Tennessee
American football teams established in 2013
Women's sports in Tennessee